Right Back Here in My Arms may refer to:

 A song by Prince from Emancipation (1996)
 A song by Sirens from Control Freaks (2004)